Naomi Payne  is an archaeologist and small finds specialist, with a particular interest in Roman material culture. She was awarded her PhD at the University of Bristol in 2003 with a thesis titled: "The medieval residences of the Bishops of Bath and Wells, and Salisbury". She is a research associate at the University of Exeter and was elected as a Fellow of the Society of Antiquaries of London on 25 March 2021.

Select publications
Payne, N. 2019. "Bronze Age, Romano-British and Anglo-Saxon Funerary Remains on the Line of the Cirencester to Fairford Buried Electricity Cable Route", Transactions of the Bristol and Gloucestershire Archaeological Society
Hughes, S., Payne, N. and Rainbird, P. 2017. "Salt of the Hearth: Understanding the Briquetage from a Later Romano-British Saltern at Pyde Drove, near Woolavington, Somerset", Britannia 48, 117–133.
Hobson, M. S., Payne, N., Cousins, J. and Faulkner, N. et al. 2014. "A Middle Anglo-Saxon settlement", in Digging Sedgeford: A people's archaeology. Cromer: Poppyland, 79–136.

References

British women archaeologists
Fellows of the Society of Antiquaries of London
21st-century archaeologists
Living people
Year of birth missing (living people)
Alumni of the University of Bristol
Women classical scholars